And the Heavens Above Us is a 1947 German drama film directed by Josef von Báky and starring Hans Albers, Paul Edwin Roth and Lotte Koch. It was part of the post-war series of rubble films.

It was shot at the Tempelhof Studios in Berlin and on location in the city. The film's sets were designed by the art directors Emil Hasler and Walter Kutz.

Cast
Hans Albers as Hans Richter
Paul Edwin Roth as Werner Richter
Lotte Koch as Edith Schröder
Annemarie Hase as Frau Burghardt
Heidi Scharf as Mizzi Burghardt
Ralph Lothar as Fritz
Otto Gebühr as Studienrat Heise
Elsa Wagner as Frau Heise
Ursula Barlen as Frau Roland
Ludwig Linkmann as Georg
Helmuth Helsig as Harry

References

External links

West German films
German drama films
German black-and-white films
1947 drama films
Films directed by Josef von Báky
Films set in Berlin
Films shot at Tempelhof Studios
1940s German-language films
1940s German films